Schwarzenburg District was one of the 26 administrative districts in the Canton of Bern, Switzerland. Its capital was the town of Schwarzenburg, located in the municipality of Wahlern. The district had an area of 157 km² and consisted of 4 municipalities:

References

Former districts of the canton of Bern